Johanna Maria-Therese Almgren (born 22 March 1984) is a Swedish former football midfielder who played for Damallsvenskan club Göteborg FC and the Swedish national team.

Almgren's career was marred by injuries. In May 2013 she was devastated to be ruled out of UEFA Women's Euro 2013, requiring surgery on her knee for the fifth time.

In November 2014 Almgren was appointed head coach of Elitettan minnows Kungsbacka DFF, with Stina Segerström as her assistant.

Personal life
During the 2008 Summer Olympics, Brazilian footballer Ronaldinho surprised Almgren by asking her to marry him, just a few hours after seeing her for the first time. She rejected the proposal outright. Almgren thought that her friend was joking with her when she got a phone call from a translator saying Ronaldinho wanted her to go to his room. After realizing it wasn't a joke she and a few friends went up. Then he asked her to marry him.

References

External links
 Kopparbergs/Göteborg FC player profile
 Sweden player profile 

Living people
1984 births
People from Borås
Swedish women's footballers
Sweden women's international footballers
Footballers at the 2008 Summer Olympics
Footballers at the 2012 Summer Olympics
Olympic footballers of Sweden
BK Häcken FF players
Damallsvenskan players
Bälinge IF players
Women's association football midfielders
Sportspeople from Västra Götaland County